After the election of Marina Mora as Miss World Peru 2001/02. The Miss Perú Universe 2002 pageant was held on April 27, 2002. That year, just 12 candidates were competing for that national crown. The chosen winner represented Peru at the Miss Universe 2002 and for the first time at Miss Earth 2002. The rest of the finalists would enter in different pageants.

Placements

Special Awards

 Best Regional Costume - Distrito Capital - Danitza Autero Stanic
 Miss Photogenic - Arequipa - Claudia Ortiz de Zevallos 
 Miss Elegance - Moquegua - Jennifer Fon
 Miss Body - Loreto - Mónica Chacón D’Vettori

Delegates

Trivia 

 Mónica Chacón D’Vettori won Miss World Peru in 1996 and International Queen of Coffee in 1997.
 Katiuska Romero entered Miss Peru 1999.
 Claudia Ortiz de Zevallos and Danitza Autero Stanic would enter Miss Peru 2003.
 Adriana Zubiate sported the same Evening Gown that Miss Ica 2001, Mirna Cabrera, wore during Miss Peru 2001.

References 

Miss Peru
2002 in Peru
2002 beauty pageants